Ukraine's 224th electoral district is a Verkhovna Rada constituency in the city of Sevastopol. Established in its current form in 2012, it contains the southern half of Sevastopol. The constituency has 95 polling stations. The district is bordered by the 225th electoral district to the north, the 10th electoral district to the north-west, the 7th electoral district to the west, and the Black Sea to the south and east.

People's Deputies

Elections

2012

See also 
 Electoral districts of Ukraine
 Foreign electoral district of Ukraine

Notes

References 

Electoral districts of Ukraine
Constituencies established in 2012